Lingyan Temple is a Buddhist temple located  in Changqing District, Jinan, Shandong Province, China, about  north of the city of Tai'an. The temple grounds are situated in a valley on the western edge of the Taishan range. The Lingyan Temple has a long recorded history, and was one of the main temples in China during the times of the Tang and Song Dynasties. Its most renowned landmarks are the 11th century Pìzhī-tǎ (辟支塔; "Pizhi Pagoda") and the Qiānfó-diàn (千佛殿, "Thousand Buddha Hall") which houses a Ming dynasty bronze Buddha statue as well as 40 painted clay statues of life-size luohan from the Song dynasty.

History
The original temple was established in the Yongxing reign period (357–358), during the reign of Fú Jiān (r. 357–385) of the Former Qin state. Gaining a greater reputation during the Northern Wei (386–534), the temple reached its apex of importance during the Tang dynasty (618–907) and Song dynasty (960–1279). There were over 40 different wooden temple halls located at the temple, composing more than 500 monastic rooms. More than 500 Buddhist monks lived at Lingyan Temple during its height. The oldest structures at the site are the various stone stupas and square-based stone Chinese pagoda in the pavilion style from the Tang dynasty, the 8th century Huichong Pagoda. Of the 167 stone stupas at the temple, no two are identical, and like the luohan statues of the Qiānfó-diàn, have been well preserved. The tallest structure of the temple is the 54 m (177 ft) tall Pìzhī-tǎ, built originally in 753, although the present structure was built from 1056 to 1063. Although the wooden halls were all reconstructed during the Ming dynasty (1368–1644) and Qing dynasty (1644–1912), the stone pedestals at the base of the pillars in the Qiānfó-diàn are the original work of the Tang and Song eras.

Gallery

See also
Architecture of the Song dynasty
List of sites in Jinan
Cassock Spring

Notes

References
Valder, Peter. (2002). Gardens in China. Portland: The Timber Press, Inc. .

External links

Lingyan Temple at ChinaCulture.org
Huichong Pagoda at China.org.cn

8th-century Buddhist temples
Religious buildings and structures completed in 1063
11th-century Buddhist temples
Song dynasty architecture
Tang dynasty Buddhist temples
Buddhist temples in Jinan
Tourist attractions in Jinan
Major National Historical and Cultural Sites in Shandong